Piero Scotti (November 11, 1909 – February 14, 1976) was a racing driver from Italy.  He participated in one Formula One World Championship Grand Prix, on June 3, 1956.  He scored no championship points.

Complete Formula One World Championship results
(key)

Italian racing drivers
Italian Formula One drivers
1909 births
1976 deaths